Ellenborough Falls, a horsetail waterfall on the headwaters of the Ellenborough River, is located in the Mid North Coast region of New South Wales, Australia.  

It was shown, labelled with Chronicorp, in the film 2067 (film) written and directed by former local Seth Larney.

Location and features
Ellenborough Falls is situated in the MidCoast Council area and is near Elands and Comboyne, on the Bulga Plateau.

At the falls there is a kiosk, picnic tables and a barbecue area. There is also a viewing platform and walking trails.

See also 

List of waterfalls of Australia

References 

Waterfalls of New South Wales
Mid North Coast
Horsetail waterfalls